Aura is the second studio album by Australian metalcore band The Brave, released on 5 April 2019 by UNFD. It was produced by Troy Brady and recorded at Heliport Studios in Buderim.

Promotion and singles
On 2 August 2017, The Brave released their single "Ethereal" and its accompanying music video. On 6 February 2019, the single "Technicolor" was released, alongside its accompanying music video. A tour to promote "Technicolor" was announced shortly after its release, Melbourne rock band Windwaker joined them. They also announced Aura and its expected release date. On 6 March, the band released their newest single, "Desolation", which was premiered on Triple J's Short.Fast.Loud segment. On 4 April, a day before the album's release, the band released the single "Burn" alongside an accompanying music video. On 15 May, the band announced an 'Aura Tour' with special guests Pridelands appearing at all but two performances.

Writing and composition
Explaining the album's title, vocalist Nathan Toussaint said: "We all believe in auras, whether it be the auras that surround the people we meet during our travels, or the ones surrounding the places we visit either on tour or in our personal lives. It’s these same auras that draw us back to these places we visit or allow us to develop relationships with new people we meet and connect with along the way. The same applies to the music we write and the aura that it carries with it."

The track "Ethereal" addresses the band's view on a world set on destroying itself. Toussaint describes "Technicolor" as "...about one of [his] first experiences of getting a little too loose when [he] was young." Many of the album's songs contains themes of love, loss, and change.

Critical reception

The album received mixed to positive reviews. Chanel Issa from Hysteria gave the album a 7/10 and said: "Aura is not the album that will see The Brave reinvent the wheel, but it is the album that will see them drop a set of some incredibly catchy metalcore tunes." Wall of Sound, in a positive review said: "The Brave have exploded back into the music scene with this one. After watching them perform recently on the Technicolor Tour, it's exciting[sic] to be able to see how far this band can go." Carl Fisher of Games, Brrraaains & A Head-Banging Life rated the album positively, however criticised the title track as being "a slow RnB style song that is just so bland and so out of place when sandwiched in between the former and the latter, Desolation. It’s not about the effects in particular as they’re layered throughout but rather how poorly used they are there. It’s just too out of left field." Alt Dialogue gave it a negative review, calling it "nothing more than generic metalcore, even that is giving it more credit than its worth." Luke Nuttall of The Soundboard gave it a mixed 5/10 saying: "It might be worth a try for the most ardent of completionists, but if this album didn’t exist at all, things would be no better or worse off."

Track listing
Track listing adapted from iTunes.

Personnel
The Brave
 Nathan Toussaint – lead vocals
 Kurt Thomson – lead guitar
 Denham Lee – rhythm guitar
 Daniel Neucom – bass
 Brent Thomson – drums

Production
 Troy Brady – producer, engineering
 WZRD BLD – mixing, mastering
 Darren Oorloff – album artwork

Charts

References

2019 albums
The Brave (band) albums
UNFD albums